Noah Spence (born January 8, 1994) is an American football defensive end who is a free agent. He played college football at Ohio State and Eastern Kentucky, and was drafted by the Tampa Bay Buccaneers in the second round of the 2016 NFL Draft.

Early years
Spence attended Bishop McDevitt High School in Harrisburg, Pennsylvania, where he played on the football team. Over his junior and senior seasons, he had 204 tackles and 35.5 sacks. As a senior, he was the Gatorade Football Player of the Year for Pennsylvania. Spence was rated by Rivals.com as a five-star recruit and was the number one weakside defensive end in his class and ninth best player overall. He committed to Ohio State University to play college football.

College career
Spence played in 12 games as a true freshman at Ohio State in 2012 and had 12 tackles and one sack. As a sophomore in 2013, he started 13 games and recorded 50 tackles and eight sacks. On January 1, 2014, he was suspended for three games, which included the 2014 Orange Bowl and the first two games of 2014, after testing positive for MDMA. In September 2014, Spence was suspended indefinitely after another failed drug test. He was ruled permanently ineligible by the Big Ten in November.

Spence transferred to Eastern Kentucky University in 2015. In his lone season at Eastern Kentucky, he had 63 tackles and 11.5 sacks and was the Ohio Valley Conference co-Defensive Player of the Year. After the season, he entered the 2016 NFL Draft.

Professional career

Tampa Bay Buccaneers
Spence was drafted by the Tampa Bay Buccaneers in the second round, 39th overall, in the 2016 NFL Draft. In the month of November, Spence had 2.5 sacks and two forced fumbles earning him Defensive Rookie of the Month.

In 2017, Spence played in six games, recording nine tackles, one sack, and a forced fumble. He was placed on injured reserve on October 25, 2017 with a shoulder injury.

On August 31, 2019, Spence was waived by the Buccaneers.

Washington Redskins
On September 18, 2019, Spence signed with the Washington Redskins. He was waived on November 19, 2019.

New Orleans Saints
On December 11, 2019, Spence signed with the New Orleans Saints.

On March 23, 2020, Spence re-signed with the Saints. He was placed on the reserve/non-football injury list on May 26, 2020, after suffering a torn ACL.

On March 2, 2021, Spence re-signed with the Saints on a one-year contract. He was released on August 17, 2021.

Cincinnati Bengals
On August 22, 2021, Spence signed with the Cincinnati Bengals. He was waived on August 31, 2021 and re-signed to the practice squad the next day.

On February 15, 2022, Spence signed a reserve/future contract. He was released on August 30, 2022.

References

External links
Ohio State Buckeyes bio
Eastern Kentucky Colonels bio

1994 births
Living people
Players of American football from Harrisburg, Pennsylvania
American football defensive ends
American football outside linebackers
Ohio State Buckeyes football players
Eastern Kentucky Colonels football players
Tampa Bay Buccaneers players
Washington Redskins players
New Orleans Saints players
Cincinnati Bengals players